Viktor Zentrich (born 13 June 2003) is a Czech professional footballer who plays as a centre-back for Regionalliga Bayern club SpVgg Unterhaching.

Club career
After having started playing football in the youth department of TSV Milbertshofen, Zentrich moved to the academy of SpVgg Unterhaching in 2015. 

On 1 July 2020, when he came on as a late substitute for Jannis Turtschan in the home game against Carl Zeiss Jena, Zentrich became the youngest ever player in 3. Liga history. At 17 years and 38 days, he lowered the record set by David Alaba in 2009 by 35 days. He played for a few minutes in the 2–2 draw. The record was later broken by teammate Fynn Seidel on 30 January 2021.

International career
Zentrich is a youth international for Czech Republic, having been capped at under-16 and under-17 level.

Career statistics

Club

References

2003 births
Living people
Czech footballers
Czech expatriate footballers
Czech Republic youth international footballers
Association football central defenders
SpVgg Unterhaching players
3. Liga players
Regionalliga players
Czech expatriate sportspeople in Germany
Expatriate footballers in Germany